In six-dimensional geometry, a truncated 6-simplex is a convex uniform 6-polytope, being a truncation of the regular 6-simplex.

There are unique 3 degrees of truncation. Vertices of the truncation 6-simplex are located as pairs on the edge of the 6-simplex. Vertices of the bitruncated 6-simplex are located on the triangular faces of the 6-simplex. Vertices of the tritruncated 6-simplex are located inside the tetrahedral cells of the 6-simplex.

Truncated 6-simplex

Alternate names 
 Truncated heptapeton (Acronym: til) (Jonathan Bowers)

Coordinates 
The vertices of the truncated 6-simplex can be most simply positioned in 7-space as permutations of (0,0,0,0,0,1,2). This construction is based on facets of the truncated 7-orthoplex.

Images

Bitruncated 6-simplex

Alternate names 
 Bitruncated heptapeton (Acronym: batal) (Jonathan Bowers)

Coordinates 
The vertices of the bitruncated 6-simplex can be most simply positioned in 7-space as permutations of (0,0,0,0,1,2,2). This construction is based on facets of the bitruncated 7-orthoplex.

Images

Tritruncated 6-simplex 

The tritruncated 6-simplex is an isotopic uniform polytope, with 14 identical bitruncated 5-simplex facets.

Alternate names 
 Tetradecapeton (as a 14-facetted 6-polytope) (Acronym: fe) (Jonathan Bowers)

Coordinates 
The vertices of the tritruncated 6-simplex can be most simply positioned in 7-space as permutations of (0,0,0,1,2,2,2). This construction is based on facets of the bitruncated 7-orthoplex. Alternately it can be centered on the origin as permutations of (-1,-1,-1,0,1,1,1).

Images

Related polytopes

Related uniform 6-polytopes 
The truncated 6-simplex is one of 35 uniform 6-polytopes based on the [3,3,3,3,3] Coxeter group, all shown here in A6 Coxeter plane orthographic projections.

Notes

References
 H.S.M. Coxeter: 
 H.S.M. Coxeter, Regular Polytopes, 3rd Edition, Dover New York, 1973 
 Kaleidoscopes: Selected Writings of H.S.M. Coxeter, edited by F. Arthur Sherk, Peter McMullen, Anthony C. Thompson, Asia Ivic Weiss, Wiley-Interscience Publication, 1995,  
 (Paper 22) H.S.M. Coxeter, Regular and Semi Regular Polytopes I, [Math. Zeit. 46 (1940) 380-407, MR 2,10]
 (Paper 23) H.S.M. Coxeter, Regular and Semi-Regular Polytopes II, [Math. Zeit. 188 (1985) 559-591]
 (Paper 24) H.S.M. Coxeter, Regular and Semi-Regular Polytopes III, [Math. Zeit. 200 (1988) 3-45]
 Norman Johnson Uniform Polytopes, Manuscript (1991)
 N.W. Johnson: The Theory of Uniform Polytopes and Honeycombs, Ph.D. 
 o3x3o3o3o3o - til, o3x3x3o3o3o - batal, o3o3x3x3o3o - fe

External links 
 Polytopes of Various Dimensions
 Multi-dimensional Glossary

6-polytopes